Hadong Station is a railway station in South Korea located at Bipa-ri, Hadong-eup, Hadong-gun, South Gyeongsang Province. It is on the Gyeongjeon Line.  As of 2016 the Mugunghwa-ho train stops at the station eight times a day.  From September 27, 2013, the S-Train made four round trips per day, but this was changed in December 2013 to two round trips per day.

Many cherry blossom trees have been planted in a row on the south side of the platform, and in early April, when the cherry blossoms begin to bloom, many tourists flock to the station to take pictures, or for a date.

History
October 5, 1967: Construction started on the station
February 7, 1968: Operation commenced as a regular station
February 29, 1968: Construction completed on the station
March 26, 1973: Designated as the arrival processing station for civilian-use coal
May 1, 2006: Handling of parcels suspended
October 31, 2009: Handling of freight suspended
September 27, 2013: Became a stop for the S-Train

Railway stations in South Gyeongsang Province